The Men's parallel giant slalom competition at the FIS Freestyle Ski and Snowboarding World Championships 2019 was held on February 4, 2019.

Qualification
The qualification was started at 09:00. After the first run, the top 32 snowboarders were allowed a second run on the opposite course.

Elimination round
The 16 best racers advanced to the elimination round.

References

Men's parallel giant slalom